The 2002 Harrogate Council election took place on 2 May 2002 to elect members of Harrogate Borough Council in North Yorkshire, England. The whole council was up for election with boundary changes since the last election in 2000 reducing the number of seats by 5. The Liberal Democrats lost overall control of the council to no overall control.

Campaign
Before the election the Liberal Democrats had a majority on the council with 39 councillors, compared to 19 Conservatives and 1 Labour councillor. Boundary changes meant that every seat was being contested for the first time since 1974. The changes reduced the number of councillors by five from 59 to 54, while increasing the number of wards from 32 to 35.

As well as candidates from the 3 main political parties, there were also 5 independents. However Wathvale ward saw the Conservative former group leader Chris Brown elected after no other candidates were nominated for the ward.

Car parking charges in Ripon were an issue in the run up to the election, with the Conservatives attacking them, but the Liberal Democrat council announced that they would end the charges in the market place in the month before the election.

Election result
The results saw the Liberal Democrats lose their majority on the council, after winning exactly half the seats on the council. The results came down to the final ward to declare in Bilton, with the Liberal Democrats and Conservatives winning one seat each in the ward. This meant the Liberal Democrats has 27 seats, compared to 26 for the Conservatives and 1 independent, Andrew Williams.

Ward results

References

2002
2002 English local elections
2000s in North Yorkshire